Jennette McCurdy is the self-titled second extended play by the American singer and actress Jennette McCurdy, released on February 8, 2012, by Capitol Records Nashville. Originally scheduled for release on January 24, 2012, Jennette McCurdy was released exclusively as a CD to Justice stores to promote McCurdy's then-upcoming eponymous debut studio album. Songs previously released on her debut EP, Not That Far Away, were included along with her 2011 single, "Generation Love" and material previously not released.

Background 
Originally intended to be her debut studio album titled The Story of My Life, McCurdy instead released her debut extended play, Not That Far Away. Her debut studio album was planned to be released in fall 2011, but was delayed to early 2012. Capitol Nashville further delayed the release of her album in January 2012, instead releasing Jennette McCurdy EP.

Track listing

Personnel 
Credits adapted from EP's liner notes.
Jennette McCurdy – lead vocals, background vocals, songwriting
Paul Worley – production, electric guitar
Jay DeMarcus – production
Chris McHugh – drums
Mark Hill – bass
Ilya Toshinsky – acoustic guitar
Tom Bukovac – electric guitar
Charlie Judge – keyboards
Paul Franklin – steel guitar
Russell Terrell – background vocals
Jonathan Yudkin – fiddle, mandolin, strings
Hillary Lindsey – background vocals
Chad Cromwell – drums
David Huff – drum loop, digital editing
Micheal Rojas – piano, B3, synth, accordion
Alison Prestwood – bass
Rob McNelley – electric guitar
Chris Rodriguez – electric guitar, harmony vocals
Biff Waston – acoustic guitar
Tania Hancheroff – harmony vocals
Wes Hightower – harmony vocals
Bruce Bouton – steel
Kenny Greenberg – electric guitar
Erik Hellerman – assistant engineer
John Naiper – assistant engineer
Adam Ayan – mastering
Andrew Mendelson – mastering
Steve Blackmoon – mixing assistant
Andrew Bazinet – mixing assistant
Sean Neff – digital editing
Daniel Bacigalupi – mastering assistant
Natthaphol Abhigantaphand – mastering assistant
Shelley Anderson – mastering assistant
Paige Conners – production coordination
Justin Niebank – mixing
Drew Bollman – mixing assistant
Mike "Frog" Griffith – production coordination
Jeremy Witt – production assistant
Clarke Schleicher – mixing
Joanna Carter – art director
Michelle Hall – art production
Kristin Barlowe – photography
Bibi Bielat – design

Release history

References

2012 EPs
Albums produced by Paul Worley
Jennette McCurdy EPs
Capitol Records EPs